Galaýmor, called in Russian Kala-I-Mor, is a village and rural council in Tagtabazar District, Mary Province, Turkmenistan. Prior to 9 November 2022 it was under the jurisdiction of Serhetabat District, which was abolished on that date by parliamentary decree.

Etymology
Atanyyazow notes that the traditional Turkmen name of this village is Morgala, in which -gala presumably means fortress. The origin and meaning of mor-, however, are unclear. He mentions that a fortress called Mori-Shaburgan existed here under the Mongols. Atanyyazow also notes that Khiva historians referred to the valley as Mori Suy ("Mori Water") and that local whitebeards call the area Morsuvi ("Mor Water"). Some meanings of mor- include clay pipes for delivering drinking water, and the colors pink and brown in some Turkmen dialects, among others. Atanyyazow discounts a folk legend attributing the name to the Persian word moor ("ant"), which would yield "ant fortress".

History
The village is located on the left bank of the Kushk River. In Soviet times it was classed as a "town of urban type" (посёлoк городского типа) from 1947 on, and was the site of a Karakul sheep state farm.

Population

Transportation
The airfield in Galaýmor is being upgraded and a new passenger terminal was being constructed as of 2019.  The village is served by an eponymous rail station on the Mary-Serhetabat line.

References

Populated places in Mary Region